G.I. Blues is a 1960 American musical comedy film directed by Norman Taurog and starring Elvis Presley and Juliet Prowse. The movie was filmed at Paramount Pictures studio, with some pre-production scenery shot on location in Germany before Presley's release from the army. The movie won a 2nd place or runner-up prize Laurel Award in the category of Top Musical of 1960.

Plot
U.S. Army Specialist 5 (SP5) Tulsa McLean (Elvis Presley) is a tank crewman with a singing career. Serving with the 3rd Armored "Spearhead" Division in West Germany, McLean dreams of running his own nightclub when he leaves the army, but such dreams don't come cheap. Tulsa and his buddies have formed a band and perform in various German "Gasthauses", night clubs, and on an Armed Forces stage. In one bar, he even discovers the record "Blue Suede Shoes" sung by someone named Elvis Presley on a jukebox.

To raise money, Tulsa places a bet with his friend Dynamite (Edson Stroll) that he can spend the night with a club dancer named Lili (Juliet Prowse), who is rumored to be hard to get since she turned down one other G.I. operator, Turk (Jeremy Slate). Dynamite and Turk have vied for women before when the two were stationed in Hawaii. When Dynamite gets transferred to Alaska, Tulsa is brought in to take his place. He is not looking forward to it, but must go through with it.

Tulsa uses his Southern charm and calls Lili "ma'am." She at first sees Tulsa as another Occupation Duty GI. Then after a day on the Rhine, Lili begins to fall for him. Tulsa's friend Cookie, meanwhile, falls in love with Lili's roommate, Tina (Letícia Román) from Italy. In the end, Rick's and Marla's baby son Tiger helps Tulsa win the bet for the outfit—and Lili's heart.

Cast
 Elvis Presley as Spec. 5 Tulsa McLean
 Juliet Prowse as Lili
 Robert Ivers as PFC Cookie
 James Douglas as Rick
 Letícia Román as Tina
 Sigrid Maier as Marla
 Scotty Moore as himself
 D.J. Fontana as himself
 Arch Johnson as MSG McGraw
 Kenneth Becker as Mac (as Ken Becker)
 Carl Crow as Walt
 Beach Dickerson as Warren
 Trent Dolan as Mickey
 Fred Essler as Papa Mueller
 John Hudson as CPT Hobart
 The Jordanaires as Themselves
 Mickey Knox as Jeeter
 Erika Peters as Trudy
 Jeremy Slate as Turk
 Edson Stroll as Dynamite 
 Ron Starr as Harvey
 Ludwig Stössel as Owner, puppet show

Background
Elvis Presley's Army career began in 1958, and by 1960 it had been two years since Presley had made his last film, King Creole. Despite his previous three films being mostly slammed by the critics, they warmed to King Creole and its star. Presley felt confident that he had a future in acting after this praise and he was looking forward to returning to Hollywood after his time in the army.

The script was written by Edmund Beloin and Henry Garson, who had done the final revisions for Hal Wallis on Don't Give Up the Ship. In 1958 they came up with an original treatment for an Elvis Presley movie called Christmas in Berlin. It was later known as Cafe Europa before becoming GI Blues.

Eight months prior to Presley being discharged, in August 1959, producer Hal Wallis visited with him in Germany to go over the script for G.I. Blues and film some on-location scenes. Although some scenes were used in the final film, Presley did not film at any time during his time there. Elvis' double, Private First Class Tom Creel, was used for some shots.

The U.S. Army supplied tanks and vehicles on manoeuvres to be used in the filming, and appointed public information officer John J. Mawn (1915–2007) as technical advisor for the film. Mawn had presided over Presley's military press conferences.

Presley returned to the U.S. in March 1960 and began work on the film in late April.

Hal Wallis originally wanted Michael Curtiz to direct but eventually selected Norman Taurog. Dolores Hart, Joan Blackman and Ursula Andress were all tested to play the female lead before deciding on Juliet Prowse.

Reception and box office
The film received mixed reviews from critics. Bosley Crowther of The New York Times was noncommittal, mostly remarking on Presley's new clean-cut image: "Gone is that rock 'n' roll wriggle, that ludicrously lecherous leer, that precocious country-bumpkin image, that unruly mop of oily hair ... Elvis is now a fellow you can almost stand." Variety remarked that the film "restores Elvis Presley to the screen in a picture that seems to have been left over from the frivolous filmusicals of World War II" and called it "rather juvenile." Harrison's Reports graded the film as "Fair-to-good ... The cast performs well and direction and production values are good. A prime attraction, aside from Juliet Prowse is the beautiful scenery of Europe in wondrous Technicolor." John L. Scott of the Los Angeles Times wrote in a generally positive review, "I wouldn't actually call Elvis sophisticated in the picture, but he has grown up, for which we give thanks. And he's learning how to act, too, particularly in the lighter sequences. I'm certain most mature theatergoers will welcome the change in Presley. Now as for his squealing teenage fans—it is hoped they also will go along with the metamorphosis." Richard L. Coe of The Washington Post write that the film "probably will satisfy the audiences for which it has been so awarely, if depressingly, created." The Monthly Film Bulletin dismissed the picture as "a series of numbers loosely strung around a trite and thin and terribly insubstantial plot. Juliet Prowse manoeuvres her superbly engineered torso through two meagre dances with infectious exuberance, but she deserves a better rôle and a more mature leading man; certainly one with more genuine fire than Presley."
  
The film opened at the Victoria Theater in New York City on November 4, 1960 grossing $31,000 in its first week. After opening in more cities in Thanksgiving week, it reached number 2 on Variety'''s weekly national box office chart. It finished the year as the fourteenth biggest box office grossing film of the year generating $4.3 million.

Despite critics being dismissive of the overall plot, the film was nominated for three awards in 1961: Best Soundtrack album Grammy, Grammy for Best Vocal Performance, Album, Male, and WGA Best Written Musical.

The success of G.I. Blues may have been the catalyst for the formulaic films that Presley was to make for much of the 1960s. His next two films, Flaming Star and Wild in the Country, were more straight acting vehicles, with fewer songs and a more serious approach to the plot lines. However, despite Presley relishing a meatier role and enjoying the chance to act dramatically, both films were less successful at the box office than G.I. Blues had been, resulting in a return to the musical-comedy genre with Blue Hawaii as his next film role. Blue Hawaii proved to be even more profitable than G.I. Blues. Currently on Rotten Tomatoes, the film has 0% rating based on 5 critics reviews.

Soundtrack

The G.I. Blues soundtrack album was nominated for two Grammy Awards in 1960 in the categories Best Sound Track Album Or Recording Of Original Cast From A Motion Picture Or Television and Best Vocal Performance Album, Male. Edmund Beloin and Henry Garson were both nominated in 1961 by the Writers Guild of America for G.I. Blues'' in the category of Best Written American Musical.

See also
 List of American films of 1960

References

External links
 
 
 
 Elvis News Network - GI Blues

Movie reviews
 Comprehensive review by Chad Plambeck at 3-B Theater
 Review by Dan Jardine	at Apollo Movie Guide.
 Review by Andy Webb at The Movie Scene.

DVD Reviews
 Review of the movie collection "Lights! Camera! Elvis! Collection (King Creole, Blue Hawaii, G.I. Blues, Fun in Acapulco, Roustabout, Girls! Girls! Girls!, Paradise, Hawaiian Style, Easy Come, Easy Go) By Noel Murray at The AV Club, August 29, 2007.
 Review of the movie collection "Lights! Camera! Elvis! Collection (King Creole, Blue Hawaii, G.I. Blues, Fun in Acapulco, Roustabout, Girls! Girls! Girls!, Paradise, Hawaiian Style, Easy Come, Easy Go) by Paul Mavis at DVD Talk, August 6, 2007.
 Review by Fusion3600 at DVD Authority.

1960 films
1960 musical comedy films
1960 romantic comedy films
American musical comedy films
American romantic comedy films
American romantic musical films
1960s English-language films
Military humor in film
Puppet films
Films set in West Germany
Films shot in Germany
Paramount Pictures films
Films directed by Norman Taurog
Films produced by Hal B. Wallis
Films about the United States Army
West German films
1960s American films